Co-counselling (spelled co-counseling in American English) is a grassroots method of personal change based on reciprocal peer counselling. It uses simple methods. Time is shared equally and the essential requirement of the person taking their turn in the role of counsellor is to do their best to listen and give their full attention to the other person.  It is not a discussion; the aim is to support the person in the client role to work through their own issues in a mainly self-directed way.

Co-counselling was originally formulated in the early 1950s by the American Harvey Jackins and originated in a schism in the Dianetics movement (itself in part derived from schisms in general semantics and cybernetics). Jackins founded the Re-evaluation Counseling (RC) Communities, with headquarters in Seattle, Washington, United States. His son, Tim Jackins, is currently the international leader of Re-evaluation Counseling and its main affiliates. Like other offshoots of Dianetics such as Scientology and the Landmark Forum, Re-evaluation Counseling has features of a cult and an authoritarian leadership structure that actively suppresses dissent and critique.

There are a number of smaller, separate, independent organizations that have resulted from breakaways from, or re-workings of, Re-evaluation Counseling. The principal one of these is Co-Counseling International (CCI).

General description
The main activity in co-counselling involves participants arranging to meet regularly in pairs to give each other peer-to-peer counselling, in turn taking the role of counsellor and client, with equal amounts of time allocated to each. Co-counselling functions by giving people an opportunity to work on whatever issues they choose with the accepting support of another person. The person in the role of counsellor acts as a facilitator to the client, sometimes as a third-party observer and sometimes as a second-party confidant. While co-counselling is sometimes practiced outside a formal organisation, formal co-counselling organisations have developed leadership and support structures, including trainings and retreats.

Safety (in the sense of being very low risk) and the sense that a co-counselling session is a safe space is important to the methods.  There are strict rules of confidentiality. In most circumstances, the counsellor may not talk about a client's session without explicit and specific permission by the client. This is stricter than in other practices where practitioners discuss clients with supervisors, colleagues and sometimes with all sorts of other people.  The peer relationship makes a considerable contribution to a sense of trust.

The nature of the co-counselling session opens up the possibility for people to get in touch with emotions that they would avoid in any other circumstance.  A belief in the value of working with emotions has become a core focus of the approach.  Co-counselling training emphasizes methods for accessing and working with emotions, and co-counsellors aim to develop and improve emotional competence through the practice. Evidence as to the actual effectiveness of this method is undemonstrated.

To get involved in co-counselling, it is usually first necessary to complete a Fundamentals course. The training involves learning how to carry out the roles of client and counsellor. Trainers may be counsellors or simply experienced members of the community.  It also covers the guidelines or rules affecting co-counselling for the particular organization. Differences in approach mean that each organization normally requires completion of one of its own courses as a prerequisite for membership, even if someone has already completed a course with another organization.

Theoretical framework and assumptions
The original theory of co-counselling centres on the concept of distress patterns. These are patterns of behaviour, that is, behaviour that tends to be repeated in a particular type of circumstance, that are irrational, unhelpful or compulsive. The theory is that these patterns are driven by the accumulated consequences in the mind of (not currently) conscious memories of past events in which the person was unable to express or discharge the emotion appropriate to the event. Co-counselling enables release from the patterns by allowing "emotional discharge" of the past hurt experiences. Such cathartic discharge includes crying, warm perspiration, trembling, yawning, laughing and relaxed, non-repetitive talking. In day-to-day life, these "discharging" actions may be limited by social norms, such as, for example, taboos around crying, which are widespread in many cultures.

Having temporary, undivided, supportive attention from another person often gives rise to strong feelings towards that person; your counsellor often becomes your best friend for life. Sometimes people "fall in love" with each other. This is similar to the phenomenon of transference, particularly when one of the partners is felt to have more authority because, for instance, they are more experienced, are teachers of co-counselling, or have authority roles within the organisation. The organisations differ in the ways that they handle this. The inability to trust and feel in real relationships is sometimes exacerbated by the intimacy of co-counselling relationship, making transference a possibility. But participants are strongly encouraged and supported to counsel through these feelings, often leading to profound changes in their perspectives and abilities around closeness. For the most part, co-counselling relationships become life-long, therapeutic partnerships that enable the participant to have healthier relationships in general.

Therapeutic context
Many co-counsellors take the view, often quite strongly, that co-counselling is not psychotherapy.  In the beginning, this was because Re-evaluation Counseling decided not to draw on any discipline of psychotherapy for its theory and practice, although RC did incorporate some ideas from psycho-analysis such as "unconscious promptings" which Jackins adapted and relabeled "restimulation".  A similar view is taken by some non-RC co-counsellors who regard psychotherapy as involving specialist techniques used by a therapist on a client and is therefore not peer and the client has little or no control over the process.

Others consider that co-counselling is psychotherapeutic, in that it enables change or therapy to take place in the psyche, soul affect or being of an individual. Co-counselling takes a positive view of the person (i.e. we are all essentially good), considers the mind and body as an integrated whole and acknowledges the value of catharsis; it is regarded as an approach within humanistic psychology, a view that would be rejected by some within RC.

Re-evaluation Counseling

The core organization structure of RC consists of classes and local communities set up by experienced co-counsellors, which are in turn organized by regions and country.

The term "re-evaluation" refers to the client's need to rethink their past distress experiences after the emotional hurt in those experiences have been discharged, and thereby regain ("re-emerge" with) their natural intellectual and emotional capacities.  The RC organization and literature do not accept the description of its practice as psychotherapy, maintaining instead that the process of developing distress patterns that dissolve through emotional discharge in the context of appreciative attention is simply a natural process that does not imply either psychopathology on the part of the individual or the need for professional treatment. Re-evaluation Counseling regards other forms of "mainstream counselling" and psychotherapy in general as frequently inadequate attempts to bring about relief from distress using methods that do not focus on discharge and re-emergence.

In RC, the client and counsellor are expected to work co-operatively, participants are expected to provide non-judgmental active listening and to "contradict" the misinformation or other conditions thought to be associated with distress patterns. RC also engages techniques such as "non-permissive" counselling, in which the counsellor intervenes to "interrupt" client patterns without the consent of the client. The structure of RC is one of clearly defined leadership, to encourage clarity in the difficult struggles many people have to achieve breakthroughs against their distresses. RC encourages counsellors to think very hard about all possible ways to assist the client in discharging.

RC approaches the issue of feelings between co-counsellors by having a strict "no-socialising" rule. RC co-counsellors are expected not to socialise or have social or sexual relationships with other co-counsellors unless these relationships pre-dated their becoming co-counsellors.  RC specifically rejects the label "transference" for this phenomenon, as this is seen as part of a "symptomatic" method typical in psychology; the original theory of co-counselling (from RC) teaches that the best thing to do in these circumstances is repeatedly counsel on, and "discharge" about, such feelings. In addition, methods of "getting attention out of distress" are available which help with the difficulty of "switching roles" between counsellor and client. When taught correctly, counsellors are soon able to grasp the difference between counselling relationships and those from outside life. However, sometimes there is a marked pull to "socialise" or confuse the boundaries of the co-counselling relationship with other types of relationships. This is one reason why many consider a well-organised community of co-counsellors with clear rules to be essential in the successful practise of co-counselling.

Re-evaluation Counseling places a high importance on the need to understand and adhere to a comprehensive theory about the nature of the universe and of human beings (known in general as the "Benign Reality"), the best ways of assisting the discharge process and of pro-liberation attitudes in co-counselling. RCers believe that, when taken together, these enable the counsellor to keep a clear picture of the client's "re-emergence" and are therefore very effective. People disagreeing with the theoretical perspective are asked to think and discharge on the points at issue before actively challenging such perspectives. The main aim is to provide a safe, stable and supportive atmosphere within which people can client skillfully and also lead "re-emergent lives" where they are not dependent in a therapeutic sense, but instead become more energetic and effective (a state known as "zestfulness" in RC).

Co-Counselling International

Co-Counselling International (CCI) was started in 1974 as a breakaway from Re-evaluation Counseling by John Heron, who was at the time director of the Human Potential Research Project, University of Surrey UK, and Tom Sargent and Dency Sargent from Hartford, Connecticut, United States. Unlike other breakaways from RC, which involved changes of leadership but otherwise continued to practice in similar ways to RC, the CCI break was ideological, and CCI developed in significantly different ways. The differences are in practice, theory and organisation.

With regard to practice, the client in CCI co-counselling is wholly in charge of the session. The client and counsellor do not work together on the client's material. The counsellor only intervenes in accordance with one of three levels of "contract"—free attention, normal and intensive—which are defined in CCI's principles. The only requirement of the counsellor, whatever the contract, is that they give "free attention" (that is, full supportive attention) to the client. The other two contracts constitute invitations to the counsellor to make interventions from within those permitted if they feel it is appropriate. The intensive contract can be similar to the RC way of working, although the counsellor is still not permitted to intervene as flexibly as in RC.

The original theory of co-counselling is taught in the CCI fundamentals training courses, and participants learn techniques for releasing, or "discharging", emotions. However, the theory is not seen as a constraint within CCI, and co-counsellors draw on the whole range of psychotherapeutic theory and methods including analytical, cognitive-behavioural and transpersonal as well as humanistic approaches. The principal constraint is that the client must be able to work self-directedly.

Organisationally, CCI is a peer network with no core structure. Local and national networks have a variety of organisation. Classes and activities are organised by individuals or groups acting self-directedly. John Heron's status within the network has always been as an equal member, although inevitably as a founder member and activist for some 15 years and the person who developed much of the thinking behind CCI, there was a certain amount of transference on him. Heron now lives in New Zealand and is involved with the CCI network there.

CCI approaches the issue of personal relationships between co-counsellors as a matter for raising awareness. CCI co-counsellors may and do have the whole range of personal relationships with other co-counsellors. However, new co-counsellors are encouraged not to develop new non-co-counselling relationships with other co-counsellors until they have more experience and experienced co-counsellors will often have people with whom they only have a co-counselling relationship. Teachers of co-counselling are strongly discouraged from having sexual relationships with people they have taught.

Relations between CCI and RC

The existence of other co-counselling organisations is generally not mentioned in RC, and RC co-counsellors are often not aware of their existence.

Amongst those within RC who know about it, CCI is often seen as an "attack organisation" and was specifically condemned as such in many private and public conversations by Jackins, who claimed that Heron had started it against a specific agreement not to, and in breach of RC guidelines he had previously agreed to. In turn, Heron and many of his supporters claimed that RC was authoritarian and cult-like, and later, that Jackins engaged in sexual abuse of clients. RC supporters parried that CCI fostered a sexually-liberal atmosphere that blurred the boundaries of co-counselling and relationships. 

The history of co-counselling including its origins with RC is normally taught on CCI Fundamentals courses.  CCI, by its nature, has no corporate opinion about RC, and individual CCI co-counsellors have their own views.  Most CCI co-counsellors have a benevolent view toward RC, regarding it as a different, alternative approach to co-counselling.  Membership of RC is not a bar to membership of CCI, and a few people manage to do both despite the RC ban.

Other co-counselling initiatives
Focusing Partnerships.  Co-counselling based on the focusing technique of Eugene Gendlin.
The Association of Karen Horney Psychoanalytic Counsellors were the original publishers of The Barefoot Psychoanalyst, which allies the practice of co-counselling with the theories of Karen Horney.  In 1987, the association became The Institute for Self-Analysis, a member of the International Karen Horney Society.
Dror Co-Counseling was founded in Israel in 1998.
Peer Listeners was an organisation set up following the resignation of Belgian Daniel Le Bon from RC in 1989.
Peak Living Network 
Une approche de la co-écoute

See also
Tim Jackins
Harvey Jackins
John Heron
List of counseling topics
Critical friend

References

Further reading
Jackins, Harvey (1970); Fundamentals of co-counselling manual; Rational Island, Seattle; 
Jackins, Harvey (1973); The human situation; Rational Island, Seattle; 
Ernst, Sheila & Goodison, Lucy (1981); In Our Own Hands; The Women's Press, London; 
Evison, Rose & Horobin, Richard (1988); Co-counselling in J Rowan & W Dryden (eds) Innovative therapy in Britain; Open University Press, Milton Keynes; 
Caroline New, Katie Kauffman (July 2004); Co-Counselling: The Theory and Practice of Re-Evaluation Counselling; Brunner-Routledge; 
R.D. Rosen, Psychobabble, 1975, chapter on Jackins and Co-counselling.

External links
Reevaluation Counseling (U.S.) home page
CoCoInfo, the Co-Counselling International (CCI) home page

Personal development
Counseling
Health movements